Full Irish may refer to:

Full Irish breakfast
The Full Irish, breakfast show
Full Irish: The Best of Gaelic Storm 2004–2014